Al piacere di rivederla is a 1976 Italian giallo-comedy film directed by Marco Leto. It is based on the novel Ritratto di provincia in rosso by Paolo Levi.

Cast
 Ugo Tognazzi: Mario Aldara
 Françoise Fabian: Viviana Bonfigli
 Miou-Miou: Patrizia
 Alberto Lionello: Don Luigi
 Franco Graziosi: Pietro Bonfigli
 Biagio Pelligra: Maresciallo dei Carabinieri
 Maria Monti: Bianca Bonfigli
 :  Morlacchi
 : La vecchia Bonfigli
 Paolo Bonacelli: the moneylender
 Claudio Bigagli:
 Roberto Longo:
 Francesco Comegna:
 Lia Tanzi:
 Barbara Nay:
 Shirley Corrigan:
 :
 Angelo Botti:

See also 
 List of Italian films of 1976

References

External links
 

1976 films
Italian crime comedy films
Giallo films
1970s crime comedy films
Films with screenplays by Maurizio Costanzo
Films scored by Fred Bongusto
1976 comedy films
1970s Italian-language films
1970s Italian films